Shaheed Benazir Bhutto Women University, previously known as the Frontier Women University, is located in Peshawar, Khyber Pakhtunkhwa, Pakistan. It was formed as result of an order from Khyber Pakhtunkhwa government in 2004 and the university has been functioning since 2005.

Departments 
The university currently has the following Departments.
 Department of Islamiyat
 Department of Physics
 Department of Law
 Department of Political Science
 Department of Psychology
 Department of Biochemistry
 Department of chemistry
 Department of Bio-Informatics
 Department of Statistics
 Department of Management Sciences
 Department of Mathematics
 Department of Urdu
 Department of Economics
 Department of Art & Design
 Department of Education
 Department of Microbiology
 Department of Computer Science
 Department of English Language & Literature

See also
 Shaheed Benazir Bhutto City University
 Shaheed Benazir Bhutto Dewan University
 Shaheed Benazir Bhutto University of Veterinary & Animal Sciences
 Benazir Bhutto Shaheed University (Karachi)
 Shaheed Benazir Bhutto University (Sheringal)
 Shaheed Benazir Bhutto University (Shaheed Benazirabad)
 Shaheed Mohtarma Benazir Bhutto Medical University
 Mohtarma Benazir Bhutto Shaheed Medical College
 Shaheed Benazir Bhutto Medical College

References

External links
Official website

Women's universities and colleges in Pakistan
2009 establishments in Pakistan
Educational institutions established in 2009
Public universities and colleges in Khyber Pakhtunkhwa
Memorials to Benazir Bhutto
Universities and colleges in Peshawar
Peshawar District